Saviour Kwaku Adzika (born 25 April 1984), popularly known as Corp Sayvee, is a Ghanaian hiplife recording artist from Takoradi. He is well known for his single "Fantefo Na Brofoa".

Early life 
Corp Sayvee, the fourth of six children, was born and raised in Takoradi to parents Mr. and Mrs. Adzika. He first attended Naval Base Basic in Takoradi where he completed his Junior Secondary School level. He then gained admission into Ghana Secondary Technical School (GSTS). He is an alumnus of University of Ghana and Kwame Nkrumah University of Science and Technology.

Music career 
Sayvee became active in Ghana's music industry in 2003. He was signed to Hammer's music group, The Last Two in 2005.

In 2008, he launched his maiden album titled "Time to Love" in Takoradi. Corp Sayvee has worked with Ghanaian artists including Sarkodie, Jupitar, Castro, Kwabena Kwabena, Keche, Quata, Atsu Koliko, Nero X among others.

Business career 
Sayvee is the founder and CEO of the CorpNation Foundation, a non-profit which supports young entrepreneurs and researchers. Its activities has included the "Corp Tour", visits to secondary schools in order to educate students about topics such as savings, investments and work-life balance, and hosting events to promote peace. 

In 2021, Sayvee was appointed by the Takoradi Technical University to serve on the advisory committee of the Communication And Media Section Programmes.

Discography

Studio albums 
Time to love (2008)

Singles

Videography

Awards and nominations

References

External links 
 Sayvee on Facebook

 Sayvee on Twitter

Living people
Ghanaian rappers
21st-century Ghanaian male singers
21st-century Ghanaian singers
1984 births
People from Western Region (Ghana)
Ghana Secondary Technical School alumni
University of Ghana alumni
Kwame Nkrumah University of Science and Technology alumni